"Chervona Ruta" is a popular Ukrainian song written by Volodymyr Ivasyuk in 1968 and performed by many singers. The song was never formally copyrighted and due to its wide popularity is considered a Ukrainian folk song. It is named after a mythological flower, the chervona ruta, which if found turning a red colour by a young girl, was meant to bring happiness in love.

The song's popularity peaked with the version performed by the Ukrainian singer Sofia Rotaru. "Chervona Ruta" is popularly known in Ukrainian and other ethnic communities that were once part of the Soviet Union and likely to be sung at weddings, karaoke and other social settings.

History 

The song and its melody was written by a 19-year-old student of the Chernivtsi Medical Institute, Volodymyr Ivasyuk. Volodymyr found in his father's library a collection of "kolomyikas" (author of the collection was Volodymyr Hnatyuk), a traditional folk songs/dance of Pokuttia and Prykarpattia.

Ivasyuk was puzzled by the mention of "chervona ruta" in some of the kolomyjkas. "Chervona ruta" literally means "red rue", however, the flowers of the plant rue are yellow. According to the local legend, the rue turns red on the Day of Ivana Kupala for a few minutes. A girl that finds that flower will be happy in love. Chervona ruta in the meaning of "red plant" or "red flower" is also associated with an attractive alpine plant with medicinal properties Rhododendron myrtifolium, that grows in the Carpathian Mountains in western Ukraine.

Performances 

The first public performance of "Chervona Ruta" (and debut of Volodymyr Ivasyuk) was on September 13, 1970, at a television broadcast from a theatre in Chernivtsi sung by the author and Olena Kuznetsova. In 1971 the Ukrainian pop group "Smerichka" performed "Chervona Ruta", and this further helped the song's rise in popularity. Performed by "Smerichka", the song won the title USSR "Song of the Year" at the 1971 Television Song Festival competition in Moscow. It was also a multiple prizewinner in other Eastern European countries, sung by other groups.

In 1971 the film Chervona Ruta was made, which featured many of the Ivasyuk's songs, including the song "Chervona Ruta", sung by Sofia Rotaru and Vasyl Zinkevych.

In 1972 the song was included by the Czech singer Pavel Liška in his album "Písničky Pro Každý Den" as the Ukrainian folk song "Až mi dáš znamení". The translation was done by Ronald Kraus. In 1972, the song "Chervona Ruta" was recorded by the Polish skiffle group "No To Co". The hard rock arrangement was made by Jerzy Krzemiński.

"Chervona Ruta" was the debut song of Ruslana (who later became winner of the Eurovision Song Contest 2004), which she performed at the Slavianski Bazaar in Vitebsk in 1996. For her performance, she won First place with the maximum points (10) from all the jury, and was congratulated by the president of Belarus.

The song was also performed by Rotaru together with the Ukrainian band "Tanok na Maidani Kongo" and was filmed for the musical film "Kingdom of Skewed Mirrors" produced by TV-channel "Rossiya" in 2008.

A Kyivan native Anna Sedokova when performing the song added some English translation, but to date the only complete English adaptation/translation and recording of this song has been by British-born singer songwriter of Ukrainian and Irish descent Stepan Pasicznyk.

"Chervona Ruta" is one of the most popular Ukrainian songs and has been performed by many singers, among them:

 Volodymyr Ivasyuk, Vasyl Zinkevych, Nazariy Yaremchuk
 Sofia Rotaru
 Nazariy Yaremchuk
 Vasyl Zinkevych
 Yaroslav Evdokimov
 Stepan Pasicznyk (English translation)
 Ruslana

See also 

 Chervona Ruta (film)
 Chervona Ruta (festival)
 Volodymyr Ivasyuk

References

External links 

 History (Ukrainian, Russian) of the song on a website in memory of Volodymyr Ivasyuk 
 Clip from Radio Svoboda "45 years Chervona Ruta" 
 Short video about 45 years "Chervona Ruta" 

Sofia Rotaru songs
Ukrainian songs
Soviet songs
1968 in the Soviet Union
1968 in Ukraine
1968 songs
Volodymyr Ivasyuk songs